St. James High School for Boys was a Roman Catholic high school in Chester, Pennsylvania in the United States. It was part of the Roman Catholic Archdiocese of Philadelphia. The mascot was the fighting bulldog.

The school closed in 1993 on the orders of the archdiocese. In 2011, Ed Gebhart of the Delco Times wrote that the ceasing of operations was "as controversial today as it was at the time".

St. James Regional Catholic School in Ridley Park, Pennsylvania, a Catholic K-8 school which opened in 2012, was named in honor of the former St. James High School. The St. James High alumni association suggested the name, and the new school asked to use the name, mascot, and colors. The St. James High alumni headquarters hosted the first fundraiser for St. James Regional.

Alumni association

After the school closed, a group of 20-30 alumni asked the archdiocese to sell or lease the building to them, but the archdiocese refused. The alumni association by 2012 built a membership base of 1,550 which may be the largest and most active alumni in the Delaware Valley.

The St. James High School alumni association established a headquarters in Eddystone, Pennsylvania with a banquet area, bar, and chapel. It is named the 'Doghouse" as a reference to the school mascot. A monument to the school was established at the headquarters in 2017.  Timothy Logue of Delco Times described the building as "de facto museum of everything St. James" including a "Wall of Honor" highlighting notable graduates.

Every Thanksgiving, the students in the varsity club conducted a food drive. The alumni association continued it after the school closed. The group of alumni doing it meet at the alumni association headquarters and call themselves "Varsity Club II".

Notable alumni
T.D. Allman – International literary figure, prize-winning author, foreign correspondent 
Dick Christy – NFL player
Frank Gallagher – NFL player
Robert Harland – television actor
Joe Klecko – NFL player
Jack McKinney – NBA coach
Jack Ramsay – basketball coach, taught and coached at St. James in 1949

References

External links
St. James Catholic School Alumni Association Website

1993 disestablishments in Pennsylvania
Boys' schools in Pennsylvania
Chester, Pennsylvania
Defunct Catholic secondary schools in Pennsylvania
Educational institutions disestablished in 1993
Schools in Delaware County, Pennsylvania